Israel Jacobs (June 9, 1726 December 10, 1796) was a colonial Pennsylvania Legislator and United States Representative from Pennsylvania's 3rd congressional district.

Biography
Jaobs was born near the Perkiomen Creek in Providence Township in the Province of Pennsylvania. and attended the public schools. Later, he was engaged in agricultural and mercantile pursuits, and was a member of the colonial Pennsylvania Assembly 1770–1774.

In 1765, Jacobs became involved in land speculation in Nova Scotia when he joined a land company headed by William Smith, Provost of the College of Philadelphia. The company, which was granted The Township of Monckton that year, also included his brothers Joseph (b.1728) and Benjamin (b.1731). Their sister, Hannah Jacobs, married the noted American astronomer David Rittenhouse.

In 1790, Jacobs was elected to the Second Congress and served from March 4, 1791 to March 3, 1793. He resumed agricultural pursuits, and died in Providence Township. His interment was probably in the graveyard of the Friends Meeting House in Providence.

References 

 
 
 The Political Graveyard

 

1726 births
1796 deaths
Members of the United States House of Representatives from Pennsylvania